Samanala Thatu (Butterfly Wings) is a 2005 Sri Lankan Sinhala children's drama film directed by Somaratne Dissanayake and produced by Renuka Balasooriya. It stars Dasun Madushanka, Suminda Sirisena and Duleeka Marapana in lead roles along with Jayalath Manoratne and Vijaya Nandasiri. Music composed by Rohana Weerasinghe. The film received mostly positive reviews. It is the 1054th Sri Lankan film in the Sinhala cinema.

Plot

Cast
 Dasun Madushanka as Sirisena aka Sira 
 Suminda Sirisena as Soththi Martin
 Duleeka Marapana as Batti
 Dulanjalie Ariyatillake as Sira's sister
 Jayalath Manoratne as Hospital keeper
 Giriraj Kaushalya as Bicycle Shop owner
 Chandra Kaluarachchi as Prostitute dealer
 Quintus Weerakoon
 Vijaya Nandasiri as Doctor
 Hemantha Iriyagama as Police Constable 
 Ajith Lokuge as Drug dealer
 Jagath Benaragama as Drug dealer
 Anton Jude as Sarath 
 Vasantha Vittachchi as Lawyer
 Sarath Chandrasiri as Money exchanger
 Renuka Balasooriya as Child Fund owner
 Gamini Hettiarachchi as Balloon businessman
 Somasiri Alakolange
 Sarath Kothalawala as Sex boy dealer
 Dayadeva Edirisinghe

Soundtrack

Awards
Dulanjalie Ariyatillake, who needs special needs, makes her debut acting in the film. She won special award for her contribution for arts in the film as well. The film also won the most popular film at 31st Sarasaviya Film Festival. Dasun Madushan won Jury Special Award at Presidential Film Festival 2006.

References

2005 films
2000s Sinhala-language films